Victoria Muntean (born 23 January 1997) is a French professional tennis player.

Muntean has a career-high WTA singles ranking of 435, attained on 27 June 2016, and a career-high WTA doubles ranking of 408, reached on 24 July 2017. She has won three singles titles and six doubles titles on tournaments of the ITF Circuit.

Career
Muntean made her WTA Tour doubles main-draw debut at the 2011 Internationaux de Strasbourg, partnering Dia Evtimova; they lost in the first round to the fourth-seeded pair of Akgul Amanmuradova and Chuang Chia-jung.

ITF Circuit finals

Singles: 8 (3 titles, 5 runner–ups)

Doubles: 20 (6 titles, 14 runner–ups)

References

External links
 
 

French female tennis players
1997 births
Living people
French people of Romanian descent
Sportspeople from Meurthe-et-Moselle